Koshlauch is a village (selo) in Arsky District, Republic of Tatarstan, Russia, located  north-west of Arsk, district's administrative center. The village is situated on the Krasnaya, Kazanka's right tributary.  Population: 151 (2000 est.); 137 (1989); all ethnic Tatars.  The main occupations of the residents are agriculture and cattle breeding.

The village is known since the Khanate of Kazan epoch. It is the native village of the Tatar poet Ğabdulla Tuqay. The museum is placed in his home.

References

Rural localities in Tatarstan
Kazansky Uyezd